Palmas Arborea is a comune (municipality) in the Province of Oristano in the Italian region Sardinia, located about  northwest of Cagliari and about  southeast of Oristano.

Palmas Arborea borders the following municipalities: Ales, Oristano, Pau, Santa Giusta, Villa Verde, Villaurbana.

Demographic evolution

References

Cities and towns in Sardinia